The SW (South Western) postcode area, also known as the London SW postcode area, is a group of 20 postcode districts within the London post town in England. The area comprises the South Western operational district (covering the subdivisions of postcode district SW1, plus SW2 through SW10) and the Battersea operational district (covering SW11 through SW20), and is the only area within the London post town to lie on both sides of the River Thames. 

Mail for the area is sorted at the Jubilee Mail Centre in Hounslow, along with mail for the TW, KT and GU postcode areas.

Postal administration
The postcode area originated in 1857 as the SW district.   In 1868 it gained some of the area of the very short-lived S district, with the rest going to SE.  It was divided into numbered districts in 1917. The South Western district consists of the postcode districts SW1–SW10 and the once Battersea-headquartered component consists of the postcode districts SW11–SW20.   The South Western head district was designated as SW1 and the rest of the numbering followed, alphabetically, by their most important parish, chapelry, topological or built environment feature names, up to 10.  Similarly as to the Battersea SW11 once "head district".

List of postcode districts
The approximate coverage of the postcode districts, with the historic postal district names shown in italics:

 
|-
! SW1A
| LONDON
| Whitehall, Buckingham Palace, the Houses of Parliament and west of St James's
| Westminster
|-
! SW1E
| LONDON
| Northern 'Victoria' around Buckingham Gate (a street) to include both sides of part of Victoria Street
| Westminster
|-
! SW1H
| LONDON
| Surrounds of St James's Park tube station centred on Broadway, Queen Anne's Gate and Old Queen Street to include both sides of part of Victoria Street – derivation: Horse Guards Parade
| Westminster
|-
! SW1P
| LONDON
| A projection around Parliament Square. Nearby Westminster School to Westminster Cathedral to CCAL, University of the Arts, London (omitting all backstreets nearest to Vauxhall Bridge Road) – derivation: Parliament Square
| Westminster
|-
! SW1V
| LONDON
| between Vauxhall Bridge, Grosvenor (or Victoria Railway) Bridge and Victoria Station, taking in both sides of Vauxhall Bridge Road; includes Pimlico
| Westminster
|-
! SW1W
| LONDON
| South or lower Belgravia and Chelsea (a corner), from Sloane Square to Victoria Station to Grosvenor Waterside basin
| Westminster, Kensington and Chelsea
|-
! SW1X
| LONDON
| Rest of Belgravia (north of Eaton Square), Knightsbridge (eastern half) and Chelsea (a corner)
| Westminster, Kensington and Chelsea
|-
! SW1Y
| LONDON
| All but the west of St James's
| Westminster
|-
! SW2
| LONDON
| Brixton district: Brixton Hill, Tulse Hill (part), Brixton (part), Streatham Hill, Clapham Park (part), Balham (part) , Lambeth
| Lambeth
|-
! SW3
| LONDON
| Chelsea district: Chelsea, Brompton, Knightsbridge (part)
| Kensington and Chelsea
|-
! SW4
| LONDON
| Clapham district: Clapham, Stockwell (part)
| Lambeth, Wandsworth
|-
! SW5
| LONDON
| Earls Court district: Earls Court
| Kensington and Chelsea
|-
! SW6
| LONDON
| Fulham district: Fulham, Parsons Green
| Hammersmith and Fulham
|-
! SW7
| LONDON
| South Kensington district: South Kensington, Knightsbridge (part)
| Kensington and Chelsea, Westminster
|-
! SW8
| LONDON
| South Lambeth district: South Lambeth, Vauxhall, Nine Elms (east), Clapham (north), Stockwell (northwest), Oval (west)
| Lambeth, Wandsworth
|-
! SW9
| LONDON
| Stockwell district: Brixton, Stockwell, Clapham (part), Oval (part)
| Lambeth
|-
! SW10
| LONDON
| West Brompton district: West Brompton, Chelsea (part)
| Kensington and Chelsea, Hammersmith and Fulham
|-
! SW11
| LONDON
| Battersea head district: Battersea, Clapham South, Nine Elms (west)
| Wandsworth, Lambeth
|-
! SW12
| LONDON
| Balham district: Balham, Clapham Park (part), Wandsworth Common (part)
| Wandsworth, Lambeth
|-
! SW13
| LONDON
| Barnes district: Barnes
| Richmond upon Thames
|-
! SW14
| LONDON
| Mortlake district: Mortlake, East Sheen
| Richmond upon Thames
|-
! SW15
| LONDON
| Putney district: Putney, Roehampton, Kingston Vale, Putney Heath, Putney Vale, Richmond Park, Roehampton Vale
| Wandsworth, Kingston upon Thames, Richmond upon Thames
|-
! SW16
| LONDON
| Streatham district: Streatham, Streatham Common, Norbury, Streatham Park, Furzedown, Streatham Vale, Mitcham Common, Pollards Hill, Eastfields, West Norwood (part)
| Lambeth, Croydon, Wandsworth, Merton
|-
! SW17
| LONDON
| Tooting district: Tooting, Balham (part), Mitcham (part), Furzedown
| Wandsworth, Merton
|-
! SW18
| LONDON
| Wandsworth district: Wandsworth Town, Southfields, Earlsfield
| Wandsworth
|-
! SW19
| LONDON
| Wimbledon district: Wimbledon, Colliers Wood, Merton Park, Merton Abbey, Southfields, Morden (part)
| Merton, Wandsworth
|-
! SW20
| LONDON
| West Wimbledon district: Raynes Park, Lower Morden, Merton Park, Wimbledon Chase, very small part of the east of New Malden
| Merton, Kingston upon Thames
|- 
|}

SW1
SW1 is the South Western head district. Since about the 1890s it has had a surplus of addresses and buildings for practical division into one set of inwards codes so is divided into smaller postcode districts since 1917 used for mail purposes. SW1 is used in geographic reference, street signs and colloquial use across most communities. Its eight subdivisions continue to be classed as one 'district'. Within SW1A are keynote inward codes including:

 SW1A 0AA – House of Commons
 SW1A 0PW – House of Lords, Palace of Westminster
 SW1A 1AA – Buckingham Palace
 SW1A 1BA – Clarence House, Residence of King Charles III during restoration of Buckingham Palace
 SW1A 2AA – 10 Downing Street, Prime Minister and First Lord of the Treasury
 SW1A 2AB – 11 Downing Street, Chancellor of the Exchequer
 SW1A 2AH – Foreign and Commonwealth Office, King Charles Street
 SW1A 2HQ – HM Treasury headquarters

SW19
SW19 is the postcode that covers Wimbledon and is used as a synonym for the Wimbledon Championships tennis tournament.

Boundaries
The SW postcode area covers parts of nine London Boroughs. North of the River Thames, it covers the southern parts of the City of Westminster, the Royal Borough of Kensington and Chelsea and the London Borough of Hammersmith and Fulham. South of the river, it covers all of the London Borough of Wandsworth, the western part of the London Borough of Lambeth, the northern parts of the London Boroughs of Merton and Croydon and the northeastern parts of the London Boroughs of Richmond upon Thames and Kingston upon Thames.

Map

See also
Postcode Address File
List of postcode areas in the United Kingdom
London postal district

References

External links
Royal Mail's Postcode Address File
A quick introduction to Royal Mail's Postcode Address File (PAF)

Postcode areas covering London